Nicola Tempesta (28 June 1935 – 20 February 2021) was an Italian judoka who competed at the 1964 and 1972 Olympics. He finished in sixth place in 1964 and was disqualified in 1972. Tempesta won more than 10 European medals, including two gold – in 1957 and 1961.

Achievements

References

External links
 

1935 births
2021 deaths
Italian male judoka
Olympic judoka of Italy
Judoka at the 1964 Summer Olympics
Sportspeople from Naples
20th-century Italian people
21st-century Italian people